Varvara Filiou (Greek: Βαρβάρα Φίλιου; born December 29, 1994, in Attiki, Greece) is a retired Greek individual rhythmic gymnast and coach. She is an eight-time (2008-2016) Greek National All-around Champion. She is one of Greece's most successful rhythmic gymnasts.

Personal life 
Filiou's mother Eleonora Marinova is a former Bulgarian rhythmic gymnast and also competed at national level in Greece gymnastics. Filiou took up rhythmic gymnastics at age seven.

Career 
Filiou has been a member of the Greek National gymnastics team since 2008 and made her senior debut in 2010. 
She spends part-time of her training season in Novogorsk in Moscow, Russia.

She has competed at the 2010 World Championships in Moscow where she finished 41st in qualifications and at the 2011 World Championships in Montpellier, France where she qualified for the All-around finals and finished 23rd. She won the silver in all-around at the 2012 Kalamata Cup ahead of Ganna Rizatdinova. She finished 13th in all-around at the 2012 European Championships. Filiou missed qualifying for the 2012 Olympics finishing 11th in London Gymnastics Olympics Test Event.

In 2013, she competed in the 2013 World Cup and 2013 Grand Prix Series. Filiou started her season competing at the 2013 Moscow Grand Prix. She won bronze in all-around at the 2013 Kalamata Cup. At the 2013 European Championships in Vienna, Austria, Filiou qualified to her first event final in ribbon where she finished 8th. She finished 10th in all-around at the 2013 Summer Universiade in Kazan, Russia. She won the silver medal in all-around at the 2013 Mediterranean Games. She then competed at the 2013 World Championships where she qualified to her first event final in ribbon finishing 4th behind Belarusian Melitina Staniouta. In the All-around final, Filiou finished 8th at Worlds behind of Ukrainian Alina Maksymenko.

In 2014, Filiou started her season competing at the 2014 Holon Grand Prix where she finished 13th in the all-around. On May 3–5, Filiou then competed at the 2014 Kalamata Cup and won the all-around silver behind Melitina Staniouta. Filiou then competed at the 2014 Corbeil-Essonnes World Cup and finished 6th in all-around behind Katsiaryna Halkina and qualified to 3 event finals. On June 10–15, Filiou competed at the 2014 European Championships and finished 16th in all-around. On August 8–10, Filiou finished 6th in all-around at the 2014 Sofia World Cup and qualified to all 4 event finals for the first time in her World Cup series competition. On September 5–7, at the 2014 World Cup Final in Kazan, Russia, after a series of errors in all 4 apparatus left Filiou finishing 32nd in all-around finals. On September 22–28, Filiou competed at the 2014 World Championships where she finished 20th in the all-around finals.

In 2015, Filiou began the season competing at the 2015 Moscow Grand Prix finishing 22nd in the all-around. On March 21–22, Filiou competed at the 2015 Thiais Grand Prix finishing 11th in the all-around behind Canada's Patricia Bezzoubenko. On April 10–12, Filiou finished 15th in the all-around at the 2015 Pesaro World Cup. Filiou competed at the 2015 Holon Grand Prix finishing 17th in all-around. On June 15–21, Filiou competed at the inaugural 2015 European Games where she finished 14th in the all-around. In August, Filiou finished 17th in the all-around at the 2015 Sofia World Cup. At the 2015 World Cup Final in Kazan, Filiou finished 13th in the all-around and qualified to ribbon finals finishing in 6th place. On September 9–13, Filiou competed at the 2015 World Championships in Stuttgart where she qualified to 1 apparatus final finishing 8th in ribbon (17.633). In the All-around finals, Filiou finished in 14th place with a total of 69.449 points.

In 2016 Season, Filiou competed at the 30th Thiais Grand Prix event in Paris, where she finished 17th in the all-around. On April 1–3, Filiou competed at the 2016 Pesaro World Cup where she finished a disappointing 37th in the all-around. On May 27–29, Filiou finished 8th in the all-around at the 2016 Sofia World Cup with a total of 70.350 points, she qualified to 3 apparatus finals. On June 17–19, Filiou competed at the 2016 European Championships where she finished in 14th place. On July 8–10, Filiou then finished 10th in the all-around at the 2016 Kazan World Cup with a total of 70.950 points - a personal best score for Filiou, she also qualified in the hoop finals finishing in 7th place. On August 19–20, Filiou competed at the 2016 Summer Olympics held in Rio de Janeiro, Brazil. She finished 15th in the rhythmic gymnastics individual all-around qualifications and did not advance into the top 10 finals.

As of 2018, she serves as coach to Indian rhythmic gymnast, Meghna Reddy Gundlapally.

Routine music information

References

External links
 Varvara Filiou at International Federation of Gymnastics
 Rhythmic Gymnastics Results
 

1994 births
Living people
Greek rhythmic gymnasts
European Games competitors for Greece
Gymnasts at the 2015 European Games
Greek people of Bulgarian descent
Mediterranean Games silver medalists for Greece
Competitors at the 2013 Mediterranean Games
Mediterranean Games medalists in gymnastics
Gymnasts at the 2016 Summer Olympics
Olympic gymnasts of Greece
Sportspeople from Attica
21st-century Greek women